Drypetes is a plant genus of the family Putranjivaceae, in the order Malpighiales.

It was previously in the family Euphorbiaceae, tribe Drypeteae, and was the sole pantropical zoochorous genus of the family.

The genus comprises about 200 species, found in Africa, southern Asia, Australia, Central America, the Caribbean, southern Florida, Mexico, and various oceanic islands. They are dioecious trees or shrubs.

Along with Putranjiva, also in the Putranjivaceae, Drypetes contains the only plants outside the Brassicales known to contain mustard oils.

Species
The Kew World Checklist of Selected Plant Families (WCSP) lists:

 Drypetes acuminata – Queensland
 Drypetes aetoxyloides – Sabah
 Drypetes aframensis – W Africa
 Drypetes afzelii – W Africa
 Drypetes alba – West Indies
 Drypetes amazonica – Ecuador, NW Brazil
 Drypetes ambigua – Madagascar
 Drypetes andamanica – Myanmar, Andaman Is
 Drypetes angustifolia – Central Africa
 Drypetes arcuatinervia – China, Vietnam
 Drypetes arguta – E + S Africa
 Drypetes assamica – E Himalayas, N Indochina
 Drypetes aubrevillei – W Africa
 Drypetes australis – KwaZulu-Natal
 Drypetes aylmeri – W Africa
 Drypetes bakembei – Central African Republic
 Drypetes balakrishnanii – Bangladesh, Myanmar
 Drypetes bathiei – Madagascar
 Drypetes bawanii – Philippines
 Drypetes bhattacharyae – Andaman & Nicobar
 Drypetes bipindensis – C Africa
 Drypetes bisacuta – Laos
 Drypetes brownii – S Mexico, C America
 Drypetes caesia – Sabah, Kalimantan
 Drypetes calvescens – C Africa
 Drypetes calyptosepala – Sumatra
 Drypetes cambodica – Cambodia, Thailand, Myanmar
 Drypetes capillipes – C Africa
 Drypetes capuronii – Madagascar
 Drypetes carolinensis – Yap
 Drypetes castilloi – Sabah
 Drypetes caustica – Réunion
 Drypetes celastrinea – Cameroon
 Drypetes celebica – Sulawesi, W New Guinea
 Drypetes chevalieri – W + C Africa
 Drypetes cinnabarina – C Africa
 Drypetes cockburnii – Malaysia
 Drypetes comorensis – Mayotte
 Drypetes confertiflora – Karnataka
 Drypetes congestiflora – China, Philippines
 Drypetes convoluta – Luzon
 Drypetes crassipes – Borneo, Sumatra, Malaysia
 Drypetes cumingii – China, Philippines
 Drypetes curtisii – S Indochina, Borneo
 Drypetes darcyana – Mayotte
 Drypetes darimontiana – Zaïre
 Drypetes dasycarpa – Thailand
 Drypetes dasyneura – Sumatra
 Drypetes deplanchei – New Guinea, Australia, Vanuatu, New Caledonia
 Drypetes detersibilis – Malaysia
 Drypetes dewildei – Sumatra
 Drypetes dinklagei – C Africa
 Drypetes diopa – C Africa
 Drypetes diversifolia – Florida Keys, Bahamas, Hispaniola
 Drypetes dolichocarpa – Saipan
 Drypetes dussii – Martinique
 Drypetes eglandulosa – Bangladesh, Assam, Myanmar
 Drypetes ellipsoidea – Leyte
 †Drypetes elliptica – either Myanmar or Andaman Islands but extinct
 Drypetes ellisii – Andaman Islands
 Drypetes eriocarpa – Sarawak
 Drypetes euryodes – Gabon, Angola
 Drypetes falcata – Camiguin
 Drypetes fallax – C Africa
 Drypetes fanshawei – Venezuela, Guyana, Ecuador
 Drypetes fernandopoana – Bioko
 Drypetes floribunda – W Africa
 Drypetes forbesii – Sumatra
 Drypetes fusiformis – Sabah, Kalimantan
 Drypetes gabonensis – Gabon, Congo
 Drypetes gardneri – India, Sri Lanka
 Drypetes gentryi – Mexico
 Drypetes gerrardii – E + S Africa
 Drypetes gerrardinoides – Tanzania
 Drypetes gilgiana – W + C Africa
 Drypetes gitingensis – Sibuyan
 Drypetes glaberrima – W New Guinea
 Drypetes glabra – Rolas I., São Tomé
 Drypetes glabridiscus – Sulawesi
 Drypetes glauca – West Indies
 Drypetes globosa – Philippines
 Drypetes gossweileri – C Africa
 Drypetes gracilis – Cameroon
 Drypetes grandifolia – Philippines
 Drypetes guatemalensis – Guatemala
 Drypetes hainanensis – Hainan, Thailand, Vietnam, Sabah, Sulawesi
 Drypetes harmandii – Laos, Thailand
 Drypetes helferi – Myanmar, Thailand
 Drypetes henriquesii – São Tomé
 Drypetes heptandra – Philippines
 Drypetes hoaensis – Yunnan, Thailand, Vietnam
 Drypetes iliae – Sabah, Sarawak
 Drypetes ilicifolia – Jamaica, Dominican Rep, Puerto Rico
 Drypetes impressinervis – Sarawak
 Drypetes inaequalis – W Africa
 Drypetes indica – S China, E Himalayas, N Indochina
 Drypetes integerrima – Ogasawara-shoto, Kazan-retto
 Drypetes integrifolia – S China
 Drypetes iodoformis – Queensland
 Drypetes ituriensis – C Africa
 Drypetes ivorensis – W Africa
 Drypetes jaintensis – Meghalaya
 Drypetes kalamii – West Bengal,India
 Drypetes kikir – Malaysia, Borneo
 Drypetes klainei – W Africa
 Drypetes kwangtungensis – Guangdong
 Drypetes laciniata – W Africa
 Drypetes laevis – Sumatra, Borneo
 Drypetes lasiogynoides – New Guinea
 Drypetes lateriflora – West Indies, Mexico, C America, Florida
 Drypetes leiocarpa – Nicobar Islands
 Drypetes leonensis – W + C Africa
 Drypetes littoralis – Taiwan, Java, Sabah, Sulawesi, Philippines
 Drypetes longifolia – SE Asia, New Guinea
 Drypetes longistipitata – Hainan
 Drypetes macrostigma – Kalimantan
 Drypetes madagascariensis – Madagascar
 Drypetes magnistipula – Gabon, Cameroon
 Drypetes malabarica – Tamil Nadu
 Drypetes maquilingensis – Philippines, Banggi, Sulawesi
 Drypetes microphylla – Nicobar Is, Malaysia, W Indonesia, Philippines
 Drypetes microphylloides – Sumatra
 Drypetes mildbraedii – C Africa
 Drypetes minahassae – Java, Sulawesi
 Drypetes moliwensis – Cameroon
 Drypetes molunduana – C Africa
 Drypetes monachinoi – Bolívar
 Drypetes monosperma – Luzon
 Drypetes mossambicensis – SE Africa
 Drypetes mucronata – Bahamas, Cuba
 Drypetes nakaiana – Palau
 Drypetes natalensis – E + S Africa
 Drypetes neglecta – Indonesia
 Drypetes nervosa – Malaysia
 Drypetes nitida – Palau
 Drypetes obanensis – C Africa
 Drypetes oblongifolia – India, Sri Lanka
 Drypetes obtusa – China, Vietnam
 Drypetes occidentalis – C Africa
 Drypetes ochrodasya – Sumatra
 Drypetes ochrothrix – Thailand, Sabah
 Drypetes oppositifolia – Madagascar
 Drypetes ovalis – Java, Philippines
 Drypetes oxyodonta – Malaysia
 Drypetes pachycarpa – Malaysia
 Drypetes pacifica – Fiji
 Drypetes parvifolia – C Africa
 Drypetes paxii- C Africa
 Drypetes pellegrinii – W Africa
 Drypetes peltophora – Cameroon
 Drypetes pendula – Thailand, Malaysia, Borneo
 Drypetes perakensis – Malaysia
 Drypetes perreticulata – S China, N Indochina
 Drypetes perrieri – Comoros, Madagascar
 Drypetes picardae – Hispaniola
 Drypetes pierreana – Gabon, Congo
 Drypetes poilanei – Vietnam
 Drypetes polyalthioides – Kalimantan
 Drypetes polyantha – C Africa
 Drypetes polyneura – Bangka, Sabah, Kalimantan
 Drypetes porteri – Tamil Nadu
 Drypetes preussii – W Africa
 Drypetes principum – C + W Africa
 Drypetes prunifera – Sabah
 Drypetes reticulata – S + E Africa
 Drypetes rhakodiskos – SE Asia
 Drypetes riparia – Malaysia
 Drypetes riseleyi – Seychelles
 Drypetes rotensis – Rota in Micronesia
 Drypetes rubriflora – Cameroon
 Drypetes salicifolia – Yunnan, Laos, Vietnam
 Drypetes sclerophylla – Kilwa in Tanzania
 Drypetes sepiaria – India, Sri Lanka
 Drypetes sessiliflora – S Brazil
 Drypetes sherffii – Sumatra
 Drypetes sibuyanensis – insular SE Asia
 Drypetes simalurensis – Sumatra, Simeuluë
 Drypetes singroboensis – Ivory Coast
 Drypetes spinosodentata – C Africa
 Drypetes standleyi – C America, Venezuela, Ecuador
 Drypetes staudtii – Nigeria, Cameroon, Congo
 Drypetes stipulacea – Madagascar
 Drypetes stipularis – Cameroon, Equatorial Guinea
 Drypetes stylosa – Sarawak
 Drypetes subcrenata – Luzon
 Drypetes subcubica – Java, Bali, New Guinea, Queensland
 Drypetes subsessilis – E Himalayas, N Thailand, N Myanmar, Andaman Is
 Drypetes subsymmetrica – Simeuluë
 Drypetes sumatrana – Sumatra, Sri Lanka, Indochina, Nicobar Is, Flores
 Drypetes talamauensis – Sumatra
 Drypetes taylorii – Kenya
 Drypetes tessmanniana – Cameroon, Equatorial Guinea
 Drypetes thorelii – Cambodia, Vietnam
 Drypetes thouarsiana – Madagascar
 Drypetes thouarsii – Madagascar
 †Drypetes tomentella – SE Asia but extinct
 Drypetes ugandensis C + E Africa
 Drypetes usambarica – Kenya, Tanzania
 Drypetes variabilis N South America
 Drypetes venusta – S India
 Drypetes vernicosa – Queensland
 Drypetes verrucosa – Gabon
 Drypetes vilhenae – Angola
 Drypetes viridis – Thailand, Malaysia
 Drypetes vitiensis – Fiji, Niue, Samoa, Tonga
 Drypetes wightii – S India
 Drypetes xanthophylloides – Sarawak
 Drypetes yapensis – Yap in Micronesia

References

External links

 
Malpighiales genera
Taxa named by Martin Vahl
Pantropical flora
Dioecious plants